Victor "Vic" Darlison (7 April 1916 – second  1982) was an English professional rugby league footballer who played in the 1930s, 1940s and 1950s.

Background
Vic Darlison was born in Pontefract, West Riding of Yorkshire, England, and he died aged  in Pontefract district, West Yorkshire, England.

Playing career

Championship final appearances
Vic Darlison played in Bradford Northern's 26–20 aggregate victory over Halifax in the Championship First Division Final during the 1944–45 season, the 2–9 defeat at Thrum Hall, Halifax, and the 24–11 victory at Odsal Stadium, Bradford.

Challenge Cup Final appearances
Vic Darlison played  in Bradford Northern's 8–3 aggregate victory over Wigan in the 1943–44 Challenge Cup Final during the 1943–44 season; the 0–3 defeat at Central Park, Wigan on Saturday 15 April 1944, in front of a crowd of 22,000, and the 8–0 victory at Odsal Stadium, Bradford on Saturday 22 April 1944, in front of a crowd of 30,000, played  in the 9–13 aggregate defeat by Huddersfield in the 1944–45 Challenge Cup Final during the 1944–45 season; the 4–7 defeat at Fartown Ground, Huddersfield on Saturday 28 April 1945, in front of a crowd of 9,041, and the 5–6 defeat at Odsal Stadium, Bradford on Saturday 5 May 1945 (three days before Victory in Europe Day), in front of a crowd of 17,500, played  in the 8–4 victory over Leeds in the 1946–47 Challenge Cup Final during the 1946–47 season at Wembley Stadium, London on Saturday 3 May 1947, in front of a crowd of 77,605, played  in the 3–8 defeat by Wigan in the 1947–48 Challenge Cup Final during the 1947–48 season at Wembley Stadium, London on Saturday 1 May 1948, in front of a crowd of 91,465, and played  in the 12–0 victory over Halifax in the 1948–49 Challenge Cup Final during the 1948–49 season at Wembley Stadium, London on Saturday 7 May 1949, in front of a crowd of 95,000.

Bradford Northern played in five of the six Challenge Cup finals between 1944 and 1949, the first two finals; the 1943–44 Challenge Cup Final against Wigan, and the 1944–45 Challenge Cup Final against Huddersfield were played over two-legs, five Bradford Northern players played in all five of these finals, they were; Eric Batten, Vic Darlison, Donald Ward, Ernest Ward, and Frank Whitcombe.

County Cup Final appearances
Vic Darlison played  in Wakefield Trinity's 9–12 defeat by the Featherstone Rovers in the 1940–41 Yorkshire County Cup Final during the 1939–40 season at Odsal Stadium, Bradford on Saturday 22 June 1940, and played  in Bradford Northern's 11–4 victory over Huddersfield in the 1949–50 Yorkshire County Cup Final during the 1949–50 season at Headingley Rugby Stadium, Leeds on Saturday 29 October 1949.

Club career
Vic Darlison made his début for the Featherstone Rovers on Tuesday 14 April 1936, he played his last match for Featherstone Rovers (in his second spell) during the 1944–45 season, he made his début for Wigan in the 13–10 victory over Oldham at Central Park, Wigan, on Saturday 29 October 1938, he played his last match for Wigan in the 0–10 defeat by Swinton at Station Road on Saturday 15 April 1939, he made his début for Wakefield Trinity during April 1940, he played his last match for Wakefield Trinity during September 1943, he appears to have scored no drop-goals (or field-goals as they are currently known in Australasia), but prior to the 1974–75 season all goals, whether; conversions, penalties, or drop-goals, scored 2–points, consequently prior to this date drop-goals were often not explicitly documented, therefore '0' drop-goals may indicate drop-goals not recorded, rather than no drop-goals scored. In addition, prior to the 1949–50 season, the archaic field-goal was also still a valid means of scoring points.

Genealogical information
Darlison's marriage to Mary E. (née Barker) was registered during first  1943 in Pontefract district, he was the younger brother of the rugby league  for the Featherstone Rovers (Heritage No. 85), and in the mid-1930s for Batley; Oliver Darlison (birth registered second  1910 in Pontefract district), and the uncle of Oliver Darlison's son, the rugby league footballer for the Featherstone Rovers (Heritage No. 270), and in the 1940s and 1950s; Geoffrey C. J. Darlison (birth registered first  1926 in Pontefract district).

References

External links
Search for "Darlison" at rugbyleagueproject.org
Photograph "Challenge cup winning side. – The Bradford Northern Challenge Cup winning side of 1944. Northern beat Wigan 8–0 after losing 3–0 away from home in the first leg. – Date: 22/04/1944" at rlhp.co.uk
Photograph "Championship winning team 1945 – Bradford Northern's Championship winning team of 1945. – Date: 01/01/1945" at rlhp.co.uk
Photograph "The 1947 Team – The 1947 Bradford Northern team that won at Wembley. – Date: 01/01/1947" at rlhp.co.uk
Photograph "1948 Challenge Cup Final – A world record crowd of 91,465 saw Bradford Northern lose to Wigan by 8 points to 3 in this 1948 Final at Wembley. Here King George VI is seen being introduced to the Bradford Northern side. – Date: 01/05/1948" at rlhp.co.uk
Photograph "1948 Challenge Cup Final– The teams take to the field. – Bradford Northern and Wigan take to the field in the 1948 Cup Final at Wembley. – Date: 01/05/1948" at rlhp.co.uk
Photograph "1948 Challenge Cup Final – Vic Darlison is held by Wigan's Ratcliffe. – Date: 01/05/1948" at rlhp.co.uk
Hooking role a tough one to call
The Millennium Masters – Forwards
Search for "Victor Darlison" at britishnewspaperarchive.co.uk
Search for "Vic Darlison" at britishnewspaperarchive.co.uk

1916 births
1982 deaths
Bradford Bulls players
Castleford Tigers players
English rugby league players
Featherstone Rovers players
Rugby league hookers
Rugby league locks
Rugby league players from Pontefract
Wakefield Trinity players
Wigan Warriors players